In Greek mythology, Leucopeus (Ancient Greek: Λευκωπεύς) was a Calydonian prince as the son of King Porthaon and Euryte. He was the brother of Oeneus (successor of their father as king of Calydon), Agrius, Alcathous, Melas, and Sterope.

Note

Reference 

 Pseudo-Apollodorus, The Library with an English Translation by Sir James George Frazer, F.B.A., F.R.S. in 2 Volumes, Cambridge, MA, Harvard University Press; London, William Heinemann Ltd. 1921. Online version at the Perseus Digital Library. Greek text available from the same website.

Princes in Greek mythology
Aetolian characters in Greek mythology